is a former Japanese football player.

Playing career
Ojima was born in Ibaraki Prefecture on February 22, 1976. After graduating from Asia University, he joined J1 League club Urawa Reds in 1998. However he could not play at all in the match until 1999 and the club was relegated to J2 League from 2000. On November 25, he debuted against Saitama SC in Emperor's Cup. However he could only play this match at the club. In 2001, he moved to J2 club Kawasaki Frontale. Although he became a regular player as center back in early 2001, he could hardly play in the match from the middle of 2001. In 2002, he moved to J2 club Montedio Yamagata. However he could not play at all in the match and retired end of 2002 season.

Club statistics

References

External links

1976 births
Living people
Asia University (Japan) alumni
Association football people from Ibaraki Prefecture
Japanese footballers
J1 League players
J2 League players
Urawa Red Diamonds players
Kawasaki Frontale players
Montedio Yamagata players
Association football defenders